Dakota Skye is a 2008 coming of age drama directed and produced by John Humber, starring Eileen April Boylan, Ian Nelson and J.B. Ghuman Jr.

Synopsis
The coming of age story of a seventeen-year-old girl who has a super power - Dakota Skye has the ability to see through any lie that she is told.  Her world changes when Jonah, her boyfriend's best friend from New York, comes into town.  For the first time she meets someone who does not lie to her.  Through this meeting, she is forced to re-examine her own life.

Reviews
The film received mixed reviews. The film was featured at several film festivals, including San Luis Obispo Film Festival, Phoenix Film Festival, Charlotte Film Festival and Edmonton International Film Festival.

Accolades
Writer Chad Shonk won the Copper Wing Award for Best Screenplay at Phoenix Film Festival 2008.  Producer John Humber won the Festival Prize for Best Narrative Feature at Charlotte Film Festival 2008.

References

External links

2008 films
British drama films
American independent films
2000s English-language films
2000s American films
2000s British films